Rowella is a rural locality in the local government area of West Tamar in the Launceston region of Tasmania. The 2016 census determined a population of 170 for the state suburb of Rowella.

History
The area has been known by various names, and as Rowella since 1912. It was gazetted as a locality in 1967.

Geography
The locality is surrounded on three sides by the Tamar River.

Road infrastructure
The C724 route (Rowella Road / West Bay Road) enters from the south and runs north and then south-east to Rowella village, where it terminates.

References

Localities of West Tamar Council
Towns in Tasmania